Events in the year 1921 in Norway.

Incumbents
Monarch – Haakon VII

Events

 6 May – A general strike begins in Norway.
 17 September – the Dovre Line was opened.
 18 September – Nidareid train disaster on the Trondhjem-Størenbanen railway line. Six people were killed in this, the first serious passenger train accident in Norway
 The 1921 Parliamentary election takes place.

Popular culture

Sports

Harald Strøm, speedskater and football player, becomes the third to receive the Egebergs Ærespris, an award presented to Norwegian athletes who excel at two (or more) different sports.

Music

Film

Literature
The Olav Duun novel I eventyret (Odin in Fairyland) from the work Juvikfolket (The People of Juvik, 1918–23), was published.

Notable births

3 January – Mosse Jørgensen, school principal and non-fiction writer (died 2009).
5 January – Odd Højdahl, trade unionist, politician and Minister (died 1994)
6 January – Hans Aardal, politician (died 1995)
15 January – Kristian Ottosen, writer and public servant (died 2006)
4 February – Valter Gabrielsen, politician (died 1999)
27 February – Eigil Gullvåg, newspaper editor and politician (died 1991)
9 March – Wanda Hjort Heger, social worker (died 2017)
21 March – Vibeke Lunde, sailor and Olympic silver medallist (died 1962)
24 March – Kjell Stormoen, actor, scenographer and theatre director (died 2010)
25 March – Fredrik Jensen, decorated soldier in the German Waffen SS (died 2011)
27 March – Vidkunn Hveding, politician and Minister (died 2001)
6 April – Erland Asdahl, politician (died 1988)
7 April – Erling Sandene, judge and civil servant (died 2015)
9 April – Asbjørn Antoni Holm, politician (died 2001)
23 April – Ola H. Kveli, politician (died 2003)
9 May – Sverre Moen, politician (died 1987)
14 May – Arve Opsahl, film and stage actor, singer and stand-up comedian (died 2007)
16 May – Odd With, politician (died 2006)
27 May – Thor Lund, politician (died 1999)
5 June – Rolf Gjermundsen, politician (died 1994)
11 June – Einar Hole Moxnes, politician and Minister (died 2006)
15 June – Harald Sverre Olsen, politician (died 2020)
27 June – Frank Weylert, actor and singer (died 2007)
30 June – Gunvor Hofmo, writer and poet (died 1995)
10 July – Eva Kløvstad, resistance leader (died 2014)
11 July – Petter Hugsted, ski jumper and Olympic gold medallist (died 2000)
13 July – Carl Monssen, rower and Olympic bronze medallist (died 1992)
15 August – Nils Christensen, aviator and aircraft engineer (died 2017)
23 September – Annemarie Lorentzen, politician and Minister (died 2008)
28 September – Åge Ramberg, politician (died 1991)
8 October – Odd Mæhlum, javelin thrower (died 2011)
10 October – Gunnar Thoresen, bobsledder (died 1972)
17 October – Edel Hætta Eriksen, schoolteacher and politician
11 November – Trygve Olsen, politician (died 1979)
27 November – Aud Alvær, politician (died 2000)
28 November – Olav Hagen, cross country skier and Olympic bronze medallist (died 2013)
25 December – Gunnar S. Gundersen, painter (died 1983)

Notable deaths
8 February – Francis Hagerup, lawyer, diplomat, politician and twice Prime Minister of Norway (born 1853)
25 February – Elizabeth Fedde, Lutheran Deaconess who established the Norwegian Relief Society (born 1850)
4 May – Waldemar Hansteen, architect (born 1857)
22 June – Gjert Holsen, politician (born 1855)
21 July – Lars Kristian Abrahamsen, politician and Minister (born 1855)
25 July – Peder Nilsen, politician and Minister (born 1846)
19 September – Erik Glosimodt, architect (born 1881)

Full date unknown
Nils S. Dvergsdal, politician (born 1842)

See also

References

External links